Tobias Adrian (born 23 July 1971) is a German and American economist who has been Financial Counsellor of the International Monetary Fund and Head of their Monetary and Capital Markets Department since 2017. He was previously employed at the Federal Reserve Bank of New York, where he was a Senior Vice President and the Associate Director of the Research and Statistics Group. His research covers aspects of risk to the wider economy of developments in capital markets. In particular, he is known for his work on the global financial crisis, monetary policy transmission, and the yield curve.

Early life and education
Adrian was born in Kronberg, West Germany and attended Humboldtschule, Bad Homburg. After studying at Goethe University Frankfurt, Paris Dauphine University, and the London School of Economics, he studied for a Ph.D. at the Massachusetts Institute of Technology, graduating in 2003. His doctoral thesis was entitled "Learning, dynamics of beliefs, and asset pricing".

Career
While working at the Federal Reserve, Adrian made substantial contributions to the role of financial intermediaries in monetary policy transmission, with Hyun-Song Shin. This is based on earlier work with Estrella that documented the forecasting power of the yield curve.

Together with Markus Brunnermeier of Princeton University, Adrian created one of the first measures of systemic risk, the CoVaR. This measure, which takes into account spillover and contagion effects between asset classes and industries, was used to stress test banks following the great recession.

Adrian has published extensively on the topic of market liquidity, including policy effects and its procyclical behavior. He has also written on the importance of the shadow banking system in capital markets, and its prominent role in the development of the financial crisis of 2007–2008.

This work led to a novel model for economic forecasting, under which multimodal distributions (allowing both "good" and "bad" outcomes) arise naturally under tight financial conditions.

Selected works

References

Living people
21st-century German economists
21st-century American economists
Federal Reserve economists
International Monetary Fund people
Alumni of the London School of Economics
Massachusetts Institute of Technology alumni

1971 births